Statistics of Swiss National League A in the 1986–87 football season.

Overview
It was contested by 16 teams, and Neuchâtel Xamax won the championship.

League standings

Results

Sources
 Switzerland 1986–87 at RSSSF

Swiss Football League seasons
Swiss
1986–87 in Swiss football